

By category

 List of Armenian Genocide memorials
 List of association football statues
 List of Australian rules football statues
 List of equestrian statues
List of hillside letters
List of Love sculptures
List of monuments of Pope John Paul II
List of statues of Karl Marx
 List of statues of Vladimir Lenin
 List of statues of Jesus
 List of statues of Queen Victoria
List of Muffler Men
List of statues
Lists of monuments and memorials
List of Whaling Walls
Trail of the Whispering Giants

By country

Armenia 

 List of statues in Yerevan

Australia
Australia's big things
New South Wales
List of public art in the City of Sydney
Queensland
List of public art in Brisbane
List of public art in South Australia
List of public art in Western Australia

Brazil 

 List of public art in São Paulo

Canada
List of public art in Halifax, Nova Scotia
List of public artworks in Montreal
O-Train public art
Toronto subway public art
List of public art in Victoria, British Columbia
Public art in Vancouver

Cameroon
 List of public art in Cameroon
List of public art in Douala

China 

 List of public art in Shanghai

Czech Republic 

 List of public art in Prague
 List of statues on Charles Bridge

Denmark
List of public art in Aarhus
List of public art in Copenhagen
List of public art in Rosenborg Castle Gardens
List of public art in Ørstedsparken
List of public art in Copenhagen Botanical Garden
List of public art in Copenhagen
 List of public art in Roskilde Municipality

Germany
List of public art in Berlin
List of public art in Hannover
 List of public art in Sylt

France 

 List of public art in Corse-du-Sud
 List of public art in Haute-Corse

India 

 List of the tallest statues in India

Ireland
List of public art in Cork city
List of public art in County Donegal
List of public art in Dublin
List of public art in Galway city
List of public art in Letterkenny
List of public art in Limerick

Israel
 List of public art in Israel

Italy 

 List of obelisks in Rome

Japan 

 List of public art in Tokyo
 List of National Treasures of Japan (sculptures)

Lithuania 

 List of public art in Vilnius

Mexico 

 List of public art in Mexico City
 List of public art in Puebla (city)

Monaco 

 List of public art in Monaco

Qatar 

 Public art in Qatar

Romania 

 List of sculptures in Herăstrău Park

Sweden 

 List of public art in Varberg

United Kingdom
England
List of public art in Bristol
 List of public art in Buckinghamshire
 List of public art in Cambridgeshire
 List of public art in Dorset
 List of public art in Greater Manchester
 List of public art in Hampshire
 List of public art in Herefordshire
 List of public art in London
 List of public art in the City of London
 List of public art on the Victoria Embankment
 List of public art in the City of Westminster
 List of public art in Belgravia
 List of public art in Covent Garden
 List of public art in Green Park
 List of public art in Hyde Park, London
 List of public art in Kensington
 List of public art in Kensington Gardens
 List of public art in Knightsbridge
 List of public art in Mayfair
 List of public art in Millbank
 List of public art in Paddington
 List of public art in Pimlico
 List of public art in St James's
 List of public art in St Marylebone
 List of public art in Soho
 List of public art in Strand, London
 List of public art in Trafalgar Square and the vicinity
 List of public art in Victoria, London
 List of public art in Westminster
 List of public art in Whitehall
 List of public art on the Victoria Embankment
 List of public art in the London Borough of Barking and Dagenham
 List of public art in the London Borough of Barnet
 List of public art in the London Borough of Bexley
 List of public art in the London Borough of Brent
 List of public art in the London Borough of Bromley
 List of public art in the London Borough of Camden
 List of public art in Covent Garden
 List of public art in the London Borough of Croydon
 List of public art in the London Borough of Ealing
 List of public art in the London Borough of Enfield
 List of public art in the London Borough of Hackney
 List of public art in the London Borough of Haringey
 List of public art in the London Borough of Hammersmith and Fulham
 List of public art in the London Borough of Harrow
 List of public art in the London Borough of Havering
 List of public art in the London Borough of Hillingdon
 List of public art in the London Borough of Hounslow
 List of public art in the London Borough of Islington
 List of public art in the London Borough of Lambeth
 List of public art in the London Borough of Lewisham
 List of public art in the London Borough of Merton
 List of public art in the London Borough of Newham
 List of public art in the London Borough of Redbridge
 List of public art in the London Borough of Richmond upon Thames
 List of public art in the London Borough of Southwark
 List of public art in the London Borough of Sutton
 List of public art in the London Borough of Tower Hamlets
 List of public art in the London Borough of Waltham Forest
 List of public art in the London Borough of Wandsworth
 List of public art in the Royal Borough of Greenwich
 List of public art in the Royal Borough of Kensington and Chelsea
 List of public art in Belgravia
 List of public art in Kensington
 List of public art in Kensington Gardens
 List of public art in Knightsbridge
 List of public art in the Royal Borough of Kingston upon Thames
 List of public art in Norfolk
 North Yorkshire
 List of public art in Harrogate
List of public art in Newcastle upon Tyne
 Nottinghamshire
 List of public art in Nottingham
 List of public art in Oxfordshire
Statuary of the West Front of Salisbury Cathedral
List of public art in Shropshire
List of public art in Somerset
List of public art in Staffordshire
List of public art in Surrey
List of public art in Warwickshire
 West Midlands
 List of public art in Birmingham
 List of public art in Coventry
 List of public art in Dudley
 List of public art in Sandwell
 List of public art in Solihull
 List of public art in Walsall
 List of public art in Wolverhampton
 Wiltshire
 List of public art in Wiltshire
 Statuary of the West Front of Salisbury Cathedral
List of public art in Worcestershire
 Scotland
 List of public art in Aberdeen
 List of public art in Angus
 List of public art in Dumfries and Galloway
 List of public art in Dundee
 List of public art in East Ayrshire
 List of public art in Edinburgh
 List of public art in Falkirk
 List of public art in Glasgow
 List of public art in North Ayrshire
 List of public art in Perth and Kinross
 List of public art in the Scottish Borders
 List of public art in South Ayrshire
 List of public art in Stirling
 Scottish war memorials
 Wales
List of public art on Anglesey
List of public art in Blaenau Gwent
List of public art in Cardiff
List of public art in Carmarthenshire
List of public art in Ceredigion
List of public art in Conwy
List of public art in Denbighshire
List of public art in Flintshire
List of public art in Gwynedd
List of public art in Monmouthshire
List of public art in Newport
List of public art in Pembrokeshire
List of public art in Powys
List of public art in Swansea
List of public art in the Vale of Glamorgan
List of public art in Wrexham County Borough

United States

Across the United States 
List of Holocaust memorials and museums in the United States
List of Confederate monuments and memorials
 List of memorials to the Grand Army of the Republic
 List of Union Civil War monuments and memorials
List of the tallest statues in the United States

By State 

Alabama
List of Confederate monuments and memorials in Alabama
Alaska
Arizona
List of hillside letters in Arizona
Arkansas
California
List of hillside letters in California
List of public art in Los Angeles
List of public art in Palm Desert, California
List of public art in San Diego
List of public art in San Francisco
List of public art in Santa Monica, California
 Colorado
List of public art in Denver
Connecticut
Delaware
Florida
List of public art in Tampa, Florida
Georgia
List of Confederate monuments and memorials in Georgia
Hawaii
Idaho
List of hillside letters in Idaho
Illinois
List of public art in Chicago
Indiana
List of public art in Indiana
List of public art in Bartholomew County, Indiana
List of public art in Boone County, Indiana
List of public art in Cass County, Indiana
List of public art in Dubois County, Indiana
List of public art in Elkhart County, Indiana
List of public art in Evansville, Indiana
List of public art in Fort Wayne, Indiana
List of public art in Indianapolis
List of public art in Crown Hill Cemetery
List of public art at Indiana University – Purdue University Indianapolis
List of public art at the Indiana Statehouse
List of outdoor artworks at Newfields
List of public art in Jasper, Indiana
List of public art in Lake County, Indiana
List of public art in LaPorte County, Indiana
List of public art in Madison County, Indiana
List of public art in New Harmony, Indiana
List of outdoor artworks at Newfields
List of public art in Spencer County, Indiana
List of public art in St. Joseph County, Indiana
List of public art in Terre Haute, Indiana
List of public art in Tippecanoe County, Indiana
List of public art in Vigo County, Indiana
 Iowa
Kansas
 List of fountains in the Kansas City metropolitan area
Kentucky
Louisiana
Maine
Maryland
List of public art in Baltimore
Massachusetts
Arts on the Line
List of public art in Boston
List of public art in Cambridge, Massachusetts
 Michigan
List of public art in Detroit
Minnesota
Mississippi
 List of Confederate monuments and memorials in Mississippi
Missouri
List of fountains in the Kansas City metropolitan area
Montana
List of hillside letters in Montana
Nebraska
List of public art in Omaha, Nebraska
Nevada
List of hillside letters in Nevada
New Hampshire
New Jersey
New Mexico
New York
List of public art in New York City
List of public art in Brooklyn
List of public art in Manhattan
List of public art in Queens
List of sculptures in Central Park
North Carolina
 List of Confederate monuments and memorials in North Carolina
List of public art in Charlotte, North Carolina
North Dakota
Ohio
List of public art in Columbus, Ohio
 Oklahoma
List of public art in Oklahoma City
Oregon
List of hillside letters in Oregon
List of public art in Ashland, Oregon
List of public art in Beaverton, Oregon
List of public art in Bend, Oregon
List of public art in Eugene, Oregon
List of public art in Gresham, Oregon
List of public art in Hillsboro, Oregon
List of public art in Lake Oswego, Oregon
List of public art in Portland, Oregon
List of public art in Salem, Oregon
 Pennsylvania
 List of monuments of the Gettysburg Battlefield
 List of public art in Philadelphia
Rhode Island
South Carolina
 List of Confederate monuments and memorials in South Carolina
South Dakota
Tennessee
Texas
List of Texas Revolution monuments and memorials
List of public art in Austin, Texas
List of public art in Houston
Utah
List of hillside letters in Utah
Vermont
Virginia
List of Confederate monuments and memorials in Virginia
List of memorials and monuments at Arlington National Cemetery
 Washington
List of public art in Kirkland, Washington
List of public art in Seattle
List of public art in Vancouver, Washington
List of public art in Washington, D.C.
List of public art in Washington, D.C., Ward 1
List of public art in Washington, D.C., Ward 2
List of public art in Washington, D.C., Ward 3
List of public art in Washington, D.C., Ward 4
List of public art in Washington, D.C., Ward 5
List of public art in Washington, D.C., Ward 6
List of public art in Washington, D.C., Ward 7
List of public art in Washington, D.C., Ward 8
Outdoor sculpture in Washington, D.C.
 West Virginia
Wisconsin
List of public art in Madison, Wisconsin
List of public art in Milwaukee
Wyoming

Public art listed by artist
List of public works by David Black
List of Alexander Calder public works
 List of Louise Nevelson public art works
List of public art by Oldenburg and van Bruggen
 List of Tony Smith public works
 List of James Turrell artworks